The Queen of Spades or Pique Dame is a 1927 German silent horror film directed by Aleksandr Razumny and starring Jenny Jugo, Rudolf Forster, and Henri de Vries. It is one of many film adaptations of the Russian writer Alexander Pushkin's 1834 short story "Pikovaya Dama" ("The Queen of Spades") and follows his story closely. It is an example of German Expressionism so prevalent there following the success of The Cabinet of Dr. Caligari in 1919. The film's sets were designed by art director Franz Schroedter.

Plot
Tomski, a Russian soldier, mentions to the other soldiers playing cards with him that, years before, his grandmother, the Countess Tomski, told him that an old sorcerer had bestowed upon her a supernatural secret to winning at cards. Another soldier named Hermann later manages to sneak into the Countess' house and tries to wrest the secret from her. The old woman dies of fright, and later her ghost returns to haunt Hermann, driving him insane.

Cast

References

Bibliography

External links

1927 films
Films of the Weimar Republic
German silent feature films
Films directed by Aleksandr Razumnyj
Films set in Russia
Films about gambling
German ghost films
Films based on The Queen of Spades
1920s historical drama films
German historical drama films
German black-and-white films
1920s ghost films
Phoebus Film films
1927 drama films
Silent drama films
Silent horror films
1920s German films